Trackdown (Trackdown Digital Pty Ltd) is an independent Australian audio post and music services facility, for the film, television, music and multimedia industries. Founded in 1984 by Simon Leadley and Geoff Watson. it provides dedicated music editing services for feature films. The facilities include a purpose-built orchestral scoring stage, 5.1 control room, ADR and foley recording studios, 5.1 film pre-mix rooms, 5.1 mix rooms and five Pro Tools edit suites.    Trackdown is located in The Entertainment Quarter Moore Park.

History – The Studio 

Trackdown began as a rehearsal and 4-track recording business called, "The Studio." in Oxford Street, Sydney. It was one of Sydney's first rehearsal/demo studios and clients included INXS, Midnight Oil, Divinyls, Do Re Mi, The Church and Dragon.

Trackdown 

In the late 1980s The studio moved to Bondi Junction, to a couple of small rooms in the basement of Hutching's Keyboards where Simon created Sydney's first half inch 16-track recording studio using the Fostex B16 then E16. The business was renamed Trackdown and was the first studio to use Sony's PCM701 digital 2-track system for final master. Clients included indie bands The Saints, Mental As Anything, Allniters, The Castanet Club, Robyne Dunn and Electric Pandas.

Camperdown Studio 

In 1990 Trackdown built a new studio complex in Camperdown, within the Yoram Gross Studio building. At this time, Digidesign's SoundTools software was emerging (later to evolve into Pro Tools). With a traditional Otari 24-track analogue and Dolby SR, and mixing to 2-track SoundTools, Trackdown recorded bands including Icehouse, The Angels, Midnight Oil and The Saints.

It was here that Simon also introduced digital technology to animation production company, Yoram Gross Films, and Trackdown became the first studio in Australia to use Pro Tools for TV picture post. Their first project was Blinky Bill animated TV Series One.

Trackdown Music Services 

In 1998 Trackdown was invited to set up a music for film division at Australia's leading feature film audio production house, Soundfirm, at Sydney's Fox Studios. They named it Trackdown Music Services - Australia's first dedicated music editing service for feature films. Music editing credits include Alex Proyas' Dark City, Master & Commander, Happy Feet, The Bank Job and Baz Luhrmann's Moulin Rouge, Australia and The Great Gatsby, for which Trackdown's Supervising Music Editor Tim Ryan and Music Editor Craig Beckett were awarded the 2014 MPSE Golden Reel for "BEST SOUND EDITING IN FEATURE FILM – MUSIC"

Simon Leadley Scoring Stage 

The purpose built orchestral recording studio, Trackdown Scoring Stage was officially opened on 9 September 2003 by Federal Minister for the Arts Senator Rod Kemp.   Trackdown engineered and built the stage in what was formerly The Simpsons Studio in Fox Studios backlot entertainment area – now The Entertainment Quarter. Described as "the missing link in Australia’s film production"   the room "has become recognized as one of the five best orchestral recording rooms in the World".  The main hall can house a 100 piece orchestra and comprises a 5.1 Monitoring Control/Mix Room, two separation booths for singers & choirs, drums or non-orchestral elements and a green room for musicians. Before its official opening the scoring stage was "test driven by the Sydney Symphony Orchestra (SSO)" to record music for the Rugby World Cup.

In addition to film scores, it is also used for video game scores, events, recording MusicMAX video sessions, live performances, film screenings, and as a rehearsal space. In 2005 Trackdown recorded both the full score for Happy Feet and also remote sessions for ADR using "Source Connect” technology. Most recently, Mentoring Sessions for The Voice Australia, were recorded in the scoring stage.  In October 2010 Trackdown scoring stage was renamed The Simon Leadley Scoring Stage in honour of its co-founder.

2006 to the present 

Trackdown's Moore Park Studio, Building 125 (adjacent to Fox Studios), houses The Simon Leadley Scoring Stage, Mix one - Trackdown's 5.1 audio edit and music mixing suites –  a Theatre, and production suites and offices for hire. 
Trackdown's recent feature film credits include Happy Feet Two and Australia. Clients and artists who have used the facilities to perform and record include Coldplay, who performed a secret intimate gig in the Scoring Stage, The Saints, Justin Bieber who performed a secret gig in Trackdown in July 2012, Will.I.Am, and One Direction
In 2013 the services were expanded with the opening of Theatre One, in partnership with Definition Films, "a 20 seat theatrette with grading, audio post, mixing and 3D screening capabilities".
In December 2015 global publisher peermusic announced a strategic partnership with Trackdown, in which Trackdown is to oversee in-house A&R, sync activities and business-related opportunities in Australian and New Zealand.

People 
 Geoff Watson - Managing Director
 Elaine Beckett - General Manager
 Simon Leadley - Trackdown Director and Leading Australian Music & Sound Craftsman – In memory of
 Tim Ryan - Supervising Music Editor
 Craig Beckett - Music Editor and Engineer

References

External links 
 Official Site
 Trackdown Scoring Stage at IMDB
 Trackdown Music Services at IMDB
 Trackdown Studios at IMDB
 Trackdown Digital at IMDB

Recording studios in Australia
Companies established in 1984
Music companies of Australia